Patient Zero is a Big Finish Productions audio drama based on the long-running British science fiction television series Doctor Who.

Plot

Charley becomes ill, which brings the Doctor to the Amethyst Viral Containment Station.  There they witness a confrontation between the Daleks and the mysterious Viyrans.

Cast

The Doctor – Colin Baker
Charley Pollard – India Fisher
Mila – Jess Robinson
Fratalin – Michael Maloney
Etheron/Daleks – Nicholas Briggs

The Three Companions
The Three Companions bonus feature, Part 4.

The Brigadier's Story by Marc Platt

Continuity
This play follows on immediately from The Raincloud Man with the Doctor determined to find out who Charley really is.
The Doctor and Charley previously encountered the Daleks in Brotherhood of the Daleks. Charley also met them with the Eighth Doctor in The Time of the Daleks and Terror Firma.
The Viyrans were last seen in the Fifth Doctor audio Mission of the Viyrans.  They return with the Sixth Doctor and Charley in Blue Forgotten Planet.
The Zero Room was first seen in Castrovalva.
Mila came aboard the TARDIS in the Doctor's first incarnation, while the Daleks were chasing him through time, possibly during the events of The Chase.  Her time with the Doctor concludes in Blue Forgotten Planet.
The Dalek Time Controller survives and returns in the Eighth Doctor story Lucie Miller / To the Death.

External links
Patient Zero

2009 audio plays
Sixth Doctor audio plays
Dalek audio plays
Audio plays by Nicholas Briggs